Wolfgang Gödicke (born 22 October 1934) is a German modern pentathlete. He competed at the 1960 and 1964 Summer Olympics for the United Team of Germany.

References

1934 births
Living people
German male modern pentathletes
Olympic modern pentathletes of the United Team of Germany
Modern pentathletes at the 1960 Summer Olympics
Modern pentathletes at the 1964 Summer Olympics
Sportspeople from Berlin